Woodland is a historic home and farm located at St. Thomas Township in Franklin County, Pennsylvania. The original section was built about 1760, and is a -story, three-bay by two-bay, fieldstone dwelling with a gable roof. A three-bay by two-bay limestone section was added in 1790, and a -story rear wing was added in 1907. A two-story porch was added to the 1790 section after 1910.  Also on the property is a contributing spring house.

It was listed on the National Register of Historic Places in 1973.

References 

Farms on the National Register of Historic Places in Pennsylvania
Houses on the National Register of Historic Places in Pennsylvania
Houses completed in 1907
Houses in Franklin County, Pennsylvania
National Register of Historic Places in Franklin County, Pennsylvania